Ripogonum (sometimes Rhipogonum) is a genus of flowering plants confined to eastern Australia, New Zealand, and New Guinea. Until recently this genus was included in the family Smilacaceae, and earlier in the family Liliaceae, but it has now been separated as its own family Ripogonaceae (sometimes Rhipogonaceae).

Like most species of the closely related Smilacaceae, most species of Ripogonum are woody vines. Differences from Smilacaceae include that Ripogonum lacks stipules, it has a wet rather than dry stigma, its seeds and leaves contain starch, and its guard cells contain oil.

Description

The six species of Ripogonum are perennials, either vines or shrubs. The leaves, which may have several different arrangements, lack stipules. The stems may have prickles. The Australian species are bisexual; others are unisexual. Individual flowers have six white to pale green or yellow tepals. The ovary has three locules with two ovules per locule. The fruit is a berry with a few brown seeds.

Taxonomy
In 1769, during explorer Lieutenant James Cook's first voyage of discovery, botanists Joseph Banks and Daniel Solander collected specimens of "supplejack" (Ripogonum scandens) in New Zealand. The species was described in Solander's unpublished manuscript  and was illustrated by Sydney Parkinson.  Cook again visited New Zealand in 1773 during his second voyage. While anchored at Dusky Bay (now Dusky Sound) in the South Island of New Zealand, he remarked in his journal:

During this voyage naturalist Johann Reinhold Forster, assisted by his son Georg Forster collected plant specimens, the elder Forster offering the following description in his journal:

In 1776, the Forsters published the genus Ripogonum in the second edition of their  with Ripogonum scandens as the type species.

Because the Greek word  begins with an aspirate rho rather than plain rho, classical scholars preferred to transcribe it with rh- rather than r-. Consequently, some early botanists treated the Forsters'  spelling as an error to be corrected and the spelling Rhipogonum was used. Which spelling is correct depends on the interpretation of Article 60 of the International Code of Nomenclature for algae, fungi, and plants, which recommends that the classical transcription rules should be followed when forming new names (Rec. 60A) and also that "the original spelling of a name or epithet is to be retained, except for the correction of typographical or orthographical errors". 

It has been stated that the Forsters' spelling is probably deliberate and should not be liable to correction in the same way as an accidental typographical error would be. The International Plant Names Index treats the spelling Rhipogonum as an "orthographic variant", and the Index Nominum Genericorum database uses the spelling Ripogonum, as does the World Checklist of Selected Plant Families .

Phylogeny and classification
Until recently, Ripogonum was included in the family Smilacaceae (and earlier in the family Liliaceae along with other lilioid monocots) but it has now been separated into its own family Ripogonaceae. The family name was first formally defined by Conran and Clifford in 1985. Armen Takhtajan later created the same family without realising it already existed.

Molecular phylogenetic studies since the early 2000s have consistently shown a close relationship between the four families Ripogonaceae, Philesiaceae, Smilacaceae and the modern narrowly defined Liliaceae. This relationship was confirmed in a 2013 study, which produced the cladogram:

The authors suggested that the Ripogonaceae and Philesiaceae could be combined into a single family based both on the genetic similarity of their plastids and common morphological features. The APG III system treats them as two separate families in the Liliales, both distinct from Smilacaceae.

Species 
Ripogonum contains only six known species .

 Ripogonum album , White supplejack – Australia (Queensland, New South Wales and Victoria) & New Guinea
 Ripogonum brevifolium , Small-leaved supplejack – Australia (Queensland and New South Wales)
 Ripogonum discolor , Prickly supplejack – Australia (Queensland and New South Wales)
 Ripogonum elseyanum , Hairy supplejack – Australia (Queensland and New South Wales)
 Ripogonum fawcettianum , Small supplejack – Australia (Queensland and New South Wales)
 Ripogonum scandens , Supplejack – the sole New Zealand species

Uses
Some species of this genus are used for constructing baskets, ropes, and fish traps by indigenous peoples. In Australia and New Zealand, Ripogonum berries are known foods for some species of mammals and birds.

Ripogonum scandens has a fibrous root rich in starch and used as a beer flavouring. It was also used in treating bowel complaints, fever, rheumatism and skin diseases. The edible small berry is dry and insipid but the cooked young shoots reportedly taste like fresh green beans. The sap is also edible.

References

External links
 Ripogonaceae  in L. Watson and M.J. Dallwitz (1992 onwards). The families of flowering plants : descriptions, illustrations, identification, information retrieval. Version: 9 March 2006. http://delta-intkey.com  
 NCBI Taxonomy Browser
 Plants for a Future Database: description of uses of Ripogonum scandens

 
Liliales genera
Flora of Australia
Flora of New Guinea
Flora of New Zealand
Taxa named by Johann Reinhold Forster